Sir Thomas Sydney Richard Nettlefold (11 November 1879 – 20 July 1956) was an Australian businessman and politician, who served as Lord Mayor of Melbourne from 1942-1945.

Footnotes

1879 births
1956 deaths
Mayors and Lord Mayors of Melbourne
Australian politicians awarded knighthoods
20th-century Australian politicians
20th-century Australian businesspeople